Thermo Kings is a 1996 remix album by the British electronic music group 808 State.

Track listing
 "Joyrider (Natural Mix)" – (7:00)
 "Balboa (Paranormal Mix)" – (6:14)
 "Azura (Ultramarine Mix)" – (5:50)
 "Azura (Fiendish Mix)" – (6:18)
 "Lopez (Metamorphic Mix)" – (6:23)
 "Lopez (Direct Neural Mix)" – (6:44)
 "Paradan" – (5:01)
 "Spanish Marching (Gala Mix)" – (5:44)
 "Goa" – (4:07)
 "Pump (Mesmer Mix)" – (3:21)

References 

808 State albums
Cleopatra Records remix albums
1998 remix albums
ZTT Records remix albums
Warner Music Group remix albums